Creatonotos omanirana is a moth of the family Erebidae. It was described by Josef J. de Freina in 2007. It is found in Oman, the United Arab Emirates and Iran.

The length of the forewings is 16–22 mm for males and 18–22.5 mm for females.

The larvae are polyphagous, but prefer Taraxacum species.

Etymology
The species is named for the country from which it was described.

References

Spilosomina
Moths described in 2007